
Gmina Brudzew is a rural gmina (administrative district) in Turek County, Greater Poland Voivodeship, in west-central Poland.

Villages
Gmina Brudzew contains the villages and settlements of Bierzmo, Bierzmo Duże, Bogdałów, Bogdałów-Kolonia, Bratuszyn, Brudzew, Brudzew Kolonia, Brudzyń, Chrząblice, Cichów, Dąbrowa, Galew, Głowy, Goleszczyzna, Izabelin, Janiszew, Janów, Koble, Kolnica, Koźmin, Kozubów, Krwony, Krwony Kolonia, Kuźnica Janiszewska, Kuźnica Koźmińska, Kwiatków, Marulew, Olimpia, Podłużyce, Sacały, Smolina, Tarnowa and Wincentów.

Neighbouring gminas
Gmina Brudzew is bordered by the gminas of Dąbie, Kościelec, Przykona, Turek, Uniejów and Władysławów.

References
Polish official population figures 2006

Brudzew
Turek County